The 2008 Alabama Democratic presidential primary was held on Super Tuesday, February 5, 2008, and had a total of 52 delegates at stake. The winner in each of Alabama's seven congressional districts was awarded all of that district's delegates, totaling 34. Another 18 delegates were awarded to the statewide winner, Barack Obama. The 52 delegates represented Alabama at the Democratic National Convention in Denver, Colorado. Eight other delegates were chosen on March 1, 2008, during an Alabama Democratic Party Executive Committee meeting. Those eight delegates attended the National Convention as officially unpledged.

Polling

Results

Analysis 
With its heavily African American population, Barack Obama solidly defeated Hillary Clinton in Alabama. According to exit polls, 51 percent of voters in the Alabama Democratic Primary were African Americans and they opted for Obama by a margin of 84–15 compared to the 44 percent of white voters who backed Clinton by a margin of 72–25. Obama won all age groups and educational attainment levels in Alabama except senior citizens aged 65 and over and those who did not complete high school. Obama won voters who identified as Democrats but Clinton won those who identified as Republicans; both candidates split among Independents. Clinton won Protestants but Obama won those who identified as Other Christian (excluding Catholics) and agnostics/atheists. 

Obama did best in the Black Belt counties in Alabama which are majority African American. He also performed extremely well in the urban areas of Birmingham, Montgomery, Mobile and Huntsville. Clinton performed best in Northern Alabama and did best in counties that were majority white.

See also 
2008 Alabama Republican presidential primary

References 

Democratic primary
Alabama
2008
2008 Super Tuesday